The Bishop's Gaiters football team represents Bishop's University in Sherbrooke, Quebec in the sport of Canadian football in the Atlantic University Sport conference of U Sports. The Bishop's Gaiters football program can trace its roots back to 1884 and has fielded teams in every decade since then. The program is one of six currently playing U Sports football that has not made a Vanier Cup appearance. However, it is the only program to have appeared in three of the four current conference championship games, with two Yates Cup games played, nine Dunsmore Cup games, and two Loney Bowl games. The program has four conference championships, all Dunsmore Cup wins, with victories in 1986, 1988, 1990, and 1994.

History

Early years
Bishop's first fielded a football team in 1884 and played in the Quebec Rugby Football Union, while also competing in 1885, 1889, and 1891. The team then joined the Canadian Intercollegiate Rugby Football Union in 1898 and competed in the intermediate series until 1955. Upon the dissolution of the Canadian Intercollegiate Athletic Union Central, which had kept the senior program membership to just four schools, Bishop's was a member of the independent Ottawa-St. Lawrence Intercollegiate Athletic Association in 1955, which had programs competing at the senior level. The national Canadian Intercollegiate Athletic Union was formed in 1961 where the Gaiters program was an inaugural member.

Bruce Coulter era
It wasn't until the early 60's that Principal Ogden Glass gave the university the direction that athletics needed to provide the necessary moral and financial support that ultimately shaped the modern day success of the Gaiters football program. Principal Glass hired Bruce Coulter as Director of Athletics and Head Football Coach in 1961. This hiring would help Bishop's develop a full-fledged athletic program with teams that could compete on the senior intercollegiate level. Coulter's team won their first championship in 1964 after defeating the Ottawa Gee-Gees 32–12 in the Ottawa-St. Lawrence Athletic Association championship. The Gaiters joined the newly formed Quebec University Athletic Association (QUAA) in 1971 and finished the season with a 6–0 record and were QUAA champions that year. With the introduction of national playoffs and the Vanier Cup in 1965, the Gaiters played in their first semi-final bowl game, the Churchill Bowl, in 1971, but lost to the Alberta Golden Bears.

The QUAA and  merged in 1974, meaning that the Gaiters were now a member of the Ontario-Quebec Intercollegiate Football Conference (OQIFC) East Division. The Gaiters played in the Yates Cup East Finals in 1976 and 1977, but would lose both games. The OQIFC reverted to a two-conference system, rather than two divisions of one conference, in 1980 so the West Division became the Ontario University Athletics Association and the Gaiters remained in the OQIFC. The Gaiters now competed for the Dunsmore Cup conference championship and made their first appearance in 1984, which was a loss to the Queen's Golden Gaels. The team returned two years later and won their first conference championship in the 1986 Dunsmore Cup game by defeating the Carleton Ravens by a score of 38–19. After losing the 1987 conference championship to McGill, the Gaiters won the Dunsmore Cup in 1988 and 1990 with both victories coming against Queen's.

Coulter retired as head football coach after the 1990 season with a then-record 137 wins (his record was 137 wins, 80 losses and 3 ties). In 1991, the football stadium was renamed in his honour and the Gaiters now play on Coulter Field. Coulter was elected to the Canadian Football Hall of Fame in 1997 based on his 29-year head coaching career at Bishop's.

Recent years
The program remained competitive shortly after Coulter's departure, with four consecutive appearances in the Dunsmore Cup game, with the one victory in 1994 over the McGill Redmen. This was the last win and appearance for the Gaiters in the Dunsmore Cup. Despite their success at the conference level, the Gaiters were winless in five Vanier Cup Semi-final bowl games. After the 1995 season, the Gaiters would not produce a team with a winning record until the 2007 season. The OQIFC was renamed the Quebec Intercollegiate Football Conference (QIFC) in 2001 after all teams were based in Quebec at that point and the QIFC was formally renamed the Quebec University Football League in 2004.

In 2007, running back Jamall Lee and then-head coach Leroy Blugh were honoured as major award winners by the Quebec University Football League. Lee was awarded the Jeff Russel Trophy, given to the league's most outstanding player, while Blugh was named QUFL Coach of the Year. Under Blugh, the program saw a marked improvement, finishing with two winning records and three playoff appearances from 2007 to 2010 as well as having several players drafted into the Canadian Football League. Blugh resigned as head coach following the 2010 season and former athletic director, Tony Addona, coached the team in 2011.

Kevin Mackey was hired as the team's head coach on January 16, 2012. After a winless season in 2012, Mackey and the Gaiters had an outstanding season in 2013 by posting a 6–2 record, which was their most wins in a season since 1993. The team was led by quarterback Jordan Heather who became the first Gaiters player to be awarded the Hec Crighton Trophy after he had a CIS record 3,132 passing yards in a single season. Mackey also won the Frank Tindall Trophy as Coach of the Year in Canadian Interuniversity Sport in 2013. Heather finished his university career in 2013 and Bishop's struggled to adapt as the team finished with a 1–7 record in 2014 and repeated the results in 2015 and 2016. Mackey resigned as the team's head coach on October 30, 2016.

Atlantic University Sport
On December 15, 2016, the Gaiters announced that their football program would compete in the Atlantic University Sport (AUS) football conference starting in the 2017 season. Being a smaller school, Bishop's felt that they could no longer compete with the Laval and Montreal programs which operated more as private businesses with much larger budgets. The move expanded the AUS to five teams and halted interlock play with the RSEQ. On December 22, 2016, it was announced that Chérif Nicolas had been hired as the 10th head coach in the modern era of the Bishop's football team. The Gaiters finished their first AUS season with a fourth consecutive 1–7 season in 2017. After a winless 2018 season, the Gaiters broke through in the 2019 season by finishing with a 4–4 record and hosting a playoff game for the first time since 1993. After a semi-final win against the Mount Allison Mounties, the team appeared in the Loney Bowl, which was a loss to the Acadia Axemen.

Rivalries
The Bishop's football team competes for two special trophies: The Mayor's Cup, which is awarded to the winner of one of the annual contests Bishop's and the Sherbrooke Vert et Or, and the Bigg Bowl, which currently goes to the winner of one of the games between Bishop's and the St. Francis Xavier X-Men.

Sherbrooke and Bishop's first met in the 1971 QUAA Championship which was a 49–2 victory for the Gaiters. However, the brewing cross-city rivalry went dormant following the disbanding of Sherbrooke's football program after the 1973 season. The Sherbrooke Vert et Or returned in 2003 and the Mayor's Cup was established in 2006 to be awarded to the winner of a regular season game between the two teams. The Mayor's Cup was played every year until 2016, marking 11 instances of the game. Following the Gaiters move to the AUS conference and the suspension of interlock play between the AUS and RSEQ, Bishop's and Sherbrooke no longer meet in the regular season.

The Bigg Bowl trophy was donated by St. FX alumnus Brian McA'Nulty and his wife Mary Adams to honour his grandfather, Reverend H. R. Canon Bigg, a rector of St. Peter's Anglican Church in Sherbrooke from 1915 to 1940 who was also a multi-sport athlete. The trophy was first awarded in 2002 and was seldom played as the Gaiters and X-Men played in separate conferences and interlock play only had the teams play three times from 2002 to 2016. When the Gaiters moved to the same conference, the teams played twice each year with one of the games designated as the Bigg Bowl game.

Recent season results
The following is the record of the Bishop's Gaiters football team since 2000:

A. Bishop's originally finished in fourth place with a 2–6 record in 2001 and lost the QUFL semi-final playoff game to Laval by a score of 48–12. However, Laval used an ineligible player throughout the entire season and vacated all regular season wins (forfeiting two wins against Bishop's) and all post-season wins (forfeiting the semi-final victory against Bishop's).

B. Bishop's and Concordia both used ineligible players in the same game, so the game was declared "no contest" in a double forfeit. Bishop's also forfeited another win against Concordia and a win against McGill.

C. The September 24, 2022 Bishop's at Saint Mary's game was cancelled due to weather and the October 29, 2022 Saint Mary's at Bishop's game was worth four points with both teams playing seven games in 2022.

National award winners
Hec Crighton Trophy: Jordan Heather (2013)
J. P. Metras Trophy: Paul Connery (1994)
Presidents' Trophy: Leroy Blugh (1988), Ray Bernard (1991), David Stipe (2001)
Peter Gorman Trophy: Kyle Williams (2004)
Frank Tindall Trophy: Bruce Coulter (1986), Ian Breck (1992), Kevin Mackey (2013)

Bishop's Gaiters in the CFL
As of the end of the 2022 CFL season, no former Gaiters players are on CFL teams' rosters. However, the following players ended the 2021 CFL season on CFL teams' rosters:
Jermaine Gabriel, Montreal Alouettes
Junior Turner, Toronto Argonauts

References

External links
 

 
U Sports teams
Sport in Sherbrooke
U Sports football teams
U Sports teams in Quebec